Thad Brown or Thaddeus Brown could refer to:

Thad F. Brown (1902–1970), former chief of the Los Angeles Police Department
Thad H. Brown (1887–1941), American politician from Ohio
Thaddeus Brown, a fictional character from the DC Comics universe
Thad Brown (broadcaster), sports reporter for WROC-TV and the Buffalo Bills